Kjell Jacobsson (born 30 November 1936) is a Swedish former sports shooter. He competed at the 1972 Summer Olympics and the 1976 Summer Olympics.

References

External links
 

1936 births
Living people
Swedish male sport shooters
Olympic shooters of Sweden
Shooters at the 1972 Summer Olympics
Shooters at the 1976 Summer Olympics
People from Strömsund Municipality
Sportspeople from Jämtland County